The northern bar-lipped skink or short-legged slender skink  (Eremiascincus isolepis) is a species of skink found in the Northern Territory and Western Australia.

References

Eremiascincus
Reptiles described in 1887
Taxa named by George Albert Boulenger